Hannah med H Soundtrack is the soundtrack to the 2003 Swedish drama film Hannah med H, recorded by the Swedish electropop duo The Knife. Made up mostly of instrumentals, the album was released in Sweden on 26 November 2003 by Rabid Records. Track 16 Listen Now was previously released on their 2003 album, Deep Cuts, which was being made at the same time. Some other tracks on it also appear as bonus tracks on the UK release of the duo's self-titled debut album, as well as on later releases of Deep Cuts.

Track listing

Personnel
The Knife – vocals, producers, engineering
Christoffer Berg – mixing
Joakim Strömholm – cover picture of Hannah (Tove Edfeldt)
Bold Faces – cover design (alternative high-contrast cover)
Henrik Jonsson – mastering

Charts

Release history

References

2003 soundtrack albums
Electronic soundtracks
Drama film soundtracks
The Knife albums